The Honourable Artillery Company Museum opened in 1987 in Armoury House, City Road, London, England. It is associated with the Honourable Artillery Company, the oldest regiment in the British Army, which still maintains an active regiment as a core part of today's Army Reserve.

History
The museum was opened in 1987 when a large volume of archival material and militaria was sorted and put on display. It was re-opened by the Duke of Edinburgh on 12 October 2011, after a complete rebuild. The collection includes uniforms, armour, silver, medals and decorations, weapons, equipment and applied art. The archives date from 1537 and are of particular interest for 17th and 18th century militia and City of London matters. Entrance is free, although it is only open to the public by appointment.

References

Sources

External links 
 Honourable Artillery Company website

Museums established in 1987
Decorative arts museums in England
Museum
Museums in the London Borough of Islington
Regimental museums in London